Cosa Nostra: Lafamilia is the sixth studio album by Gazza released in 2009 under Gazza Music Productions. Most of the album was produced by the then up-and-coming producer Kapro. It includes appearances from TeQuila, Betholdt, Dama Do Bling, 4x4 Too Much Power and Mandoza among others.

The album includes the hit songs "Shukusha", "Sixxa",'"Eembwetule" and "Penduka". The video for "Shukusha" was nominated for the 2010 Channel O Music Video Awards in the category of best kwaito video. "Penduka" was nominated for the 2011 Namibian Annual Music Awards for best kwaito.

Track listing

2009 albums
Gazza (musician) albums
Albums produced by Elvo